Durgadakeri is a village in Dharwad district of Karnataka, India.

Demographics 
As of the 2011 Census of India there were 203 households in Durgadakeri and a total population of 951 consisting of 480 males and 471 females. There were 143 children ages 0-6.

References

Villages in Dharwad district